Patricia Patts (born July 31, 1967) is an American actress, singer, songwriter and entrepreneur.  She played the lead role in the 1978 Los Angeles touring production of Annie, and the voice of Peppermint Patty on the Peanuts TV specials from 1979-80

Biography
Patts was born July 31, 1967, in California.  She is one of five children, all of whom were involved in acting or music. She started as a child actor in the early 1970s performing in local theatre companies in the Pasadena area. At age six, she appeared in her first commercial for Mama Celeste Pizza.

Patts attended Pasadena Alternative School and, while a student, was appointed to a student trustee's position on the Pasadena Board of Education.

In 1977, Norman Lear was casting for a new version of The Little Rascals. Patts had originally auditioned for the role of Darla, but since she wasn't the Darla type, they wrote in a new role for her; Rocky. That year she also had a small role in the short lived TV show, A Year at the Top. In 1978, she auditioned, along with 2,000 other girls, for a role in the Los Angeles touring production of Annie. She won the title role and went on to play the part in San Francisco and Los Angeles between 1978-1979. At the same time, she was also the voice of Peppermint Patty for the Peanuts cartoons.

Patts went on to work on a number of television shows including Archie Bunker's Place, TV 101, Student Exchange (TV movie), The Judge, K*I*D*S, and A Place to Call Home (TV movie). She also has roles in the films Party Line and For Keeps.

In 2013, Patts opened a business called Write Off the Row. In 2017, in anticipation of the 40th Anniversary of the musical Annie, she was invited by Inside Edition to New York to celebrate the musical. She was featured on the news show singing "Something was Missing" from Annie.

She currently lives outside of Nashville, Tennessee.

Filmography

Theater

Discography

References

External links

1967 births
20th-century American actresses
Living people
Actresses from Sacramento, California
American child actresses
American film actors
American television actors
American voice actresses
21st-century American women